Valentin Marian Ghionea (born 29 April 1984 in Craiova) is a Romanian handballer who plays for Dinamo București and the Romanian national team.

Achievements
Liga Națională:
Winner: 2005, 2012
Cupa României:
Winner: 2010, 2012
Mistrzostwa Polski:
Silver Medallist: 2013, 2014, 2015, 2016
Puchar Polski:
Finalist: 2014, 2015, 2016
Nemzeti Bajnokság I:
Silver Medallist: 2008, 2009, 2010
Magyar Kupa:
Winner: 2008
Finalist: 2009, 2010
EHF Cup Winners' Cup:
Quarterfinalist: 2009, 2011
EHF Challenge Cup:
Quarterfinalist: 2004, 2005

Individual awards
 Romanian Handballer of the Year: 2008, 2015
 Liga Națională Top Scorer: 2005, 2007

References

1984 births
Living people
Sportspeople from Craiova
Romanian male handball players
CS Dinamo București (men's handball) players
HC Dobrogea Sud Constanța players
Wisła Płock (handball) players
Sporting CP handball players
Expatriate handball players
Romanian expatriate sportspeople in Hungary
Romanian expatriate sportspeople in Poland
Romanian expatriate sportspeople in Portugal